is a Japanese karateka. Competing in the above 68 kg kumite division she won gold medals at the 2016 World Championships, 2017 Asian Championships, and 2018 Asian Games. She also won bronze medals at the 2012 and 2014 world championships and 2014 Asian Games.

She won a gold medal at the 2023 Karate Premiere League in Cairo, Egypt.

References

External links

 
 
 

1992 births
Living people
People from Yachimata
Japanese female karateka
Gōjū-ryū practitioners
Shotokan practitioners
Teikyo University alumni
Sportspeople from Chiba Prefecture
Asian Games gold medalists for Japan
Asian Games bronze medalists for Japan
Asian Games medalists in karate
Karateka at the 2014 Asian Games
Karateka at the 2018 Asian Games
Medalists at the 2014 Asian Games
Medalists at the 2018 Asian Games
Karateka at the 2020 Summer Olympics
Olympic karateka of Japan
21st-century Japanese women